End of Disclosure is the twelfth studio album by Swedish death metal band Hypocrisy. It was released on 22 March 2013. To promote the album, Nuclear Blast released the music video "Tales of Thy Spineless" on 4 April.

Background
Frontman Peter Tägtgren described End of Disclosure as a "back to basics" album. He indicated that the album was written after reflecting on the preceding albums, for which he felt that the band "lost it". By contrast, Tägtgren described End of Disclosure as "straight to the point. It's more Hypocrisy than ever — the fast, the heavy, the epic."

On 22 February 2013, Hypocrisy released a video for the title track of the album, "End of Disclosure".

Critical reception

The album received moderately positive reviews, with critics noting that the album would appeal to the band's fanbase but did not advance Hypocrisy's sound. Chris Dick, writing for Decibel Magazine, criticized End of Disclosure for its "potluck songwriting", which gave the impression that the album was "cycling through various stages of Hypocrisy's (and the Abyss's) repertoire, giving it a shiny, modern coat of paint and calling it an album". Natalie Zed, writing for About.com, praised the album for the "menace and hostility" of its atmosphere but described it as "an album that revisits familiar themes rather than break[s] new ground". Laura Wiebe explained in Exclaim! that the album accomplished Peter Tägtgren's intended goal of going "back to basics" and generally "rolls out more like a highlight reel of Hypocrisy's specialties".

Track listing

Personnel
Hypocrisy
Peter Tägtgren – vocals, guitar; mixing, recording
Mikael Hedlund – bass
Reidar "Horgh" Horghagen – drums
Hypocrisy - songwriting (1–10)

Additional personnel
Jonas Kjellgren – mastering, guitar solo (2)
Wes Benscoter – cover art
Rob Kimura – layout
Wattie Buchan – songwriting (11)

Charts

References

2013 albums
Hypocrisy (band) albums
Nuclear Blast albums
Albums with cover art by Wes Benscoter
Albums produced by Peter Tägtgren